Pedro Daniel Gómez (born 31 December 1990) is a Mexican racewalking athlete. He holds a personal best of 1:20:05 hours for the 20 kilometres race walk, set in 2016. He represented his country at the 2016 Summer Olympics. He also competed at the 2009 World Championships in Athletics and is a three-time participant at the IAAF World Race Walking Cup (2008, 2010, 2012).

Gómez competed internationally for Mexico in racewalking from a young age, coming fourth at the 2005 World Youth Championships in Athletics at the age of fourteen. Success came soon afterwards with silver medals at the 2006 Central American and Caribbean Youth Championships and the 2007 World Youth Championships. A gold medal came at the 2009 Pan American Junior Athletics Championships.

He began competing in the senior ranks in 2008. He took team gold at the 2009 Pan American Race Walking Cup, having finished fourth. A team bronze followed at the 2010 IAAF World Race Walking Cup. He placed in the top six at the Central American and Caribbean Games in both 2010 and 2014.

Personal bests
5000 metres race walk – 19:11.86 min (2014)
10,000 metres race walk – 41:13.90 min (2011)
10 kilometres race walk – 40:02 min (2011)
20 kilometres race walk – 1:20:05 (2016)
50 kilometres race walk – 3:53:23 (2016)

All information from All-Athletics profile.

International competitions

References

External links

Living people
1990 births
Mexican male racewalkers
Olympic athletes of Mexico
Athletes (track and field) at the 2016 Summer Olympics
World Athletics Championships athletes for Mexico
Competitors at the 2010 Central American and Caribbean Games
Competitors at the 2014 Central American and Caribbean Games
21st-century Mexican people